Zacompsia metallica is a species of ulidiid or picture-winged fly in the genus Zacompsia of the family Ulidiidae.

References

Ulidiinae